Copenhagen Airport, Kastrup Station is a railway station in Tårnby, Denmark, served by DSB’s regional trains including the Øresundtrain network. The nearby Lufthavnen metro station is served by the Copenhagen Metro’s line M2. The station opened on 27 September 1998, and was subsequently reconstructed and reopened on 28 September 2007, with a connection to the Copenhagen Metro opening the following month. The stations take their names from Copenhagen Airport, to which they are connected. It is linked to Ørestad station on the M1 line by DSB regional trains. It is located in fare zone 4.

The airport's railway station is the closest to the check-in and arrival area in Terminal 3. It is located below ground under Terminal 3. It is served by the following types of trains:
 Local trains between Copenhagen Central Station and Malmö Central Station. These trains also stop at Tårnby and Ørestad en route to Copenhagen, and at Hyllie and Triangeln en route to Malmö. To Copenhagen every 10 minutes, and to Malmö every 20 minutes.
 Regional trains on Zealand and southern Sweden. Connects to Klampenborg, Helsingør, Lund, Helsingborg, Landskrona and Hässleholm.
 Intercity trains to the rest of Denmark including Odense, Fredericia, Aarhus, Esbjerg and Aalborg.
 Intercity trains in southern Sweden connects to Gothenburg, Kalmar and Karlskrona (see Øresundståg).
 High-speed X 2000 trains to Stockholm.
Temporarily from 4 January 2016 to 4 May 2017, Sweden required train and bus transport companies entering Sweden to perform full identity check of every passenger, because of the European migrant crisis. For that reason the Southern platform was used only for departures to Sweden, with border checks at openings in fence erected along the platform. All arrivals and all departures to Denmark used the Northern platform. Only the regional trains towards Helsingør and Sweden used Copenhagen Airport station, all other trains did not go here during this period.

There is a decision to build platforms at the two tracks north of the existing station, so far used for freight trains.

Lufthavnen (‘Airport’) metro station is located slightly further off than the railway station, at the far end of Terminal 3 on the level 2. The metro connects to Nørreport Station and Vanløse station.

Services

See also
 List of railway stations in Denmark

References

External links
 
 Lufthavnen (Airport) on www.m.dk
 Information about the extension to the airport on www.m.dk 

Railway stations in Copenhagen
Airport railway stations in Denmark
Railway stations opened in 2007
Øresund Line
Railway stations located underground in Denmark
Transit centers in Denmark
Railway stations in Denmark opened in the 21st century